The St. Mary's Church or Virgin Mary's Church is an Eastern Orthodox cave church on the island of Maligrad, in the Albanian part of Lake Prespa. It is a Cultural Monument of Albania. The church is dedicated to Saint Mary and was built by Serbian nobleman Kesar Novak (alb. Qesar Novaku), in 1369.

The church has frescoes and Greek inscriptions dated to 1369. Frescoes exist of the family of Novak, with his Greek wife Kalia.

References

Churches completed in 1369
14th-century Eastern Orthodox church buildings
Cultural Monuments of Albania
Buildings and structures in Pustec Municipality
1369 establishments in Europe
Cave churches
Churches in Albania
Churches in Korçë County
Byzantine church buildings in Albania
Prespa National Park (Albania)